When You Were Shouting at the Devil... We Were in League with Satan is the third album by Canadian metal band Zimmers Hole. The name is a reference to Mötley Crüe's album Shout at the Devil, as well as the band Venom's first album, Welcome to Hell, containing the song "In League with Satan".

Drummer Gene Hoglan is also the current drummer for the touring version of Dethklok, which is referenced by a voice cameo from Nathan Explosion from the virtual version of Dethklok on "The Vowel Song".

Track listing

Personnel 
Chris Valagao (also known as "Heathen") – vocals
Jed Simon – guitar, editing
Byron Stroud – bass
Gene Hoglan – drums
Steve Wheeler – drums on "Fista Corpse"
Nathan Explosion (voiced by Brendon Small) – vocals on "The Vowel Song"
Zimmers Hole – production
Devin Townsend – production, mixing
Craig Waddell – mastering at Gotham City Studios
Matt Koyanagi – editing
Shaun Thingvold – editing
Mike Young – editing

References

2008 albums
Zimmers Hole albums
Century Media Records albums
Albums produced by Devin Townsend